Streptomyces aurantiogriseus is a bacterium species from the genus Streptomyces which has isolated from soil in Russia. Streptomyces aurantiogriseus produces differolide and acetamidobenzoic acid.

See also 
 List of Streptomyces species

References

Further reading

External links
Type strain of Streptomyces aurantiogriseus at BacDive -  the Bacterial Diversity Metadatabase

aurantiogriseus
Bacteria described in 1958